Avatar: The Last Airbender (abbreviated as ATLA), also known as Avatar: The Legend of Aang in some regions or simply Avatar, is an American animated fantasy action television series created by Michael Dante DiMartino and Bryan Konietzko and produced by Nickelodeon Animation Studio. 

Avatar is set in an Asiatic-inspired world in which some people can telekinetically manipulate one of the four elements—water, earth, fire or air—through practices known as "bending", inspired by Chinese martial arts. The only individual who can bend all four elements, the "Avatar", is responsible for maintaining harmony among the world's four nations, and serves as the link between the physical world and the spirit world. The series is centered around the journey of twelve-year-old Aang, the current Avatar and last survivor of his nation, the Air Nomads, along with his friends Katara, Sokka, and later Toph, as they strive to end the Fire Nation's war against the other nations of the world. It also follows the story of Zuko—the exiled prince of the Fire Nation, seeking to restore his lost honor by capturing Aang, accompanied by his wise uncle Iroh—and later, his ambitious sister Azula. Avatar is presented in a style that combines anime with American cartoons and relies on the imagery of primarily Chinese culture, with some other East Asian, Southeast Asian, South Asian, New World, Siberian, and Arctic influences.

Avatar: The Last Airbender was a ratings success and received widespread acclaim from audiences and critics alike for its characters, cultural references, art direction, voice acting, soundtrack, humor, and themes. These include concepts rarely touched on in youth entertainment, including war, genocide, imperialism, totalitarianism, indoctrination and free choice. It won five Annie Awards, a Genesis Award, a Primetime Emmy Award, a Kids' Choice Award, and a Peabody Award. The show is regarded by several critics as one of the greatest animated television series of all time.

Avatar aired on Nickelodeon for three seasons, from February 2005 to July 2008. The extended Avatar franchise includes an ongoing comics series, a prequel novel series, an animated sequel series, and a live-action film, as well as an upcoming live-action remake series produced for Netflix. The complete series was released on Blu-ray in June 2018 in honor of the tenth anniversary of its finale and was made available to stream on Netflix in the United States and Canada in May 2020, on Paramount+ in June 2020, and on Amazon Prime Video in January 2021.

Series overview

Setting

Avatar: The Last Airbender is set in a world where human civilization consists of four nations, named after the four classical elements: the Water Tribes, the Earth Kingdom, the Fire Nation, and the Air Nomads. In each nation, certain people, known as "benders" (waterbenders, earthbenders, firebenders and airbenders), have the ability to telekinetically manipulate and control the element corresponding to their nation, using gestures based on Chinese martial arts. The "Avatar" is the only individual with the ability to bend all four elements.

The Avatar is an international arbiter whose duty is to maintain harmony among the four nations, and act as a mediator between humans and spirits. When the Avatar dies, their spirit is reincarnated in a new body, who will be born to parents in the next nation in a set order known as the Avatar cycle: Fire, Air, Water, and Earth. By tradition, the new Avatar will travel the world to learn all four bending arts, after which they will begin in earnest their role as global peacekeeper. The Avatar can enter a condition known as the "Avatar State", in which they temporarily gain the skills and knowledge of all their past incarnations. Although this is when they are at their most powerful, if the Avatar was ever killed while in the Avatar State, the reincarnation cycle would be broken and the Avatar would cease to exist.

Synopsis

A century ago, young Avatar Aang, afraid of his new responsibilities, fled from his home and was forced into the ocean by a storm. He encased himself and his sky bison Appa in suspended animation in an iceberg near the South Pole. Shortly afterward, Fire Lord Sozin, the ruler of the Fire Nation, launched a world war to expand his nation's empire. Knowing that the Avatar must be an Air Nomad, he carried out a genocide against the Air Nomads with the help of a comet enhancing firebenders' power. A hundred years later, siblings Katara and Sokka, teenagers of the Southern Water Tribe, accidentally discover Aang and revive him.

In the first season, Aang travels with Katara and Sokka to the Northern Water Tribe so he can learn waterbending and be prepared to defeat the Fire Nation. Prince Zuko, the banished son of the current Fire Lord Ozai, pursues them, accompanied by his uncle Iroh, hoping to capture the Avatar in order to restore his honor. Aang is also pursued by Zhao, a Fire Nation admiral aspiring to win Ozai's favor. When his navy attacks the Northern Water Tribe, Zhao kills the moon spirit; Yue, the princess of the tribe, sacrifices her life to revive it, and Aang drives off the enemy fleet.

In the second season, Aang learns earthbending from Toph Beifong, a blind twelve-year-old earthbending prodigy. Zuko and Iroh, now fugitives from the Fire Lord, become refugees in the Earth Kingdom, eventually settling in its capital Ba Sing Se. Both groups are pursued by Azula, Zuko's younger sister and a firebending prodigy. Aang's group travels to Ba Sing Se to seek the Earth King's support for an attack on the Fire Nation timed to an upcoming solar eclipse, during which firebenders will be powerless. Azula instigates a coup d'état, bringing the capital under Fire Nation control, and Zuko sides with his sister. Aang is fatally wounded by Azula, but he is revived by Katara.

In the third season, Aang and his allies invade the Fire Nation capital during the solar eclipse, but are forced to retreat. Zuko abandons the Fire Nation to join Aang and teach him firebending. Aang, raised by monks to respect all life, wrestles with the possibility that he will have to kill Ozai to end the war. When Sozin's comet returns, Aang confronts Ozai and uses his Avatar powers to strip Ozai of his firebending ability; meanwhile, Aang's friends liberate Ba Sing Se, destroy the Fire Nation airship fleet, and capture Azula. Zuko is crowned the new Fire Lord and the war comes to an end.

Episodes

The series consists of sixty-one episodes. The first episode—an-hour-long premiere—aired on February 21, 2005, on Nickelodeon. The series concluded with a two-hour television movie broadcast on July 19, 2008. Each season of the series is known as a "book", in which each episode is referred to as a "chapter". Each book takes its name from one of the elements Aang must master: Water, Earth, and Fire. The show's first two seasons each consists of twenty episodes and the third season has twenty-one. The entire series has been released on DVD in regions 1, 2 and 4.

 the complete series is available on Netflix in the United States. It became the most popular show on US Netflix within the first week of its release there, despite not being featured on the main page. The show broke the record for longest consecutive appearance on Netflix's daily top ten list, with 60 straight days on the list, one of only two shows in the top ten record holders that wasn't a Netflix original series as of July 2020. Later in June 2020, the complete series became available on Paramount+ (at the time CBS All Access) and later on Amazon Prime Video in January 2021.

Development

Conception and production

Avatar: The Last Airbender was co-created and produced by Michael Dante DiMartino and Bryan Konietzko at Nickelodeon Animation Studios in Burbank, California. Its animation was mostly done by South Korean studios JM Animation, DR Movie, and MOI Animation. According to Konietzko, the series was conceived in early 2001 when he took an old sketch of a balding, middle-aged man and imagined the man as a child. He drew the character herding bison in the sky and showed the sketch to DiMartino, who was watching a documentary about explorers trapped at the South Pole.

Konietzko described their early development of the concept: "There's an air guy along with these water people trapped in a snowy wasteland ... and maybe some fire people are pressing down on them". Two weeks later, the co-creators successfully pitched the idea to Nickelodeon vice-president and executive producer Eric Coleman.

The series was introduced to the public in a teaser reel at Comic-Con 2004, and premiered on February 21, 2005.

In an interview, Konietzko said: "Mike and I were really interested in other epic 'Legends & Lore' properties, like Harry Potter and Lord of the Rings, but we knew that we wanted to take a different approach to that type of genre. Our love for Japanese anime, Hong Kong action and kung fu cinema, yoga, and Eastern philosophies led us to the initial inspiration for Avatar: The Last Airbender."

According to head writer Aaron Ehasz, Konietzko and DiMartino originally envisioned the series being three seasons long but Nickelodeon asked Ehasz what his ideas for a fourth season would be, and he later discussed these ideas with both Konietzko and DiMartino. Ehasz believed that a fourth season would be created but this plan was interrupted when Konietzko and DiMartino became occupied with assisting M. Night Shyamalan on the film The Last Airbender. Ehasz says that Shyamalan insisted they create a fourth season instead, but Konietzko and DiMartino wanted to focus on the live-action film as they were executive producers on the project. However, Konietzko and DiMartino have denied this, and claim that a fourth season was never considered by themselves nor Nickelodeon.

Pilot
A pilot episode for the series was made in 2003. It was animated by Tin House, Inc., written by Michael Dante DiMartino and Bryan Konietzko, and directed by Dave Filoni. Mitchel Musso voiced Aang in this pilot but was later replaced by Zach Tyler Eisen when the show began production. In the episode, Sokka and his sister Kya (renamed to Katara by the time the series aired) must travel the world to find masters for Aang, who is the Avatar; however, they must evade a critical foe, Prince Zuko of the Fire Nation, who wants to capture Aang.

This episode was first publicly released as one of the extras in the NTSC season 1 DVD box set, which were not available with the previously released individual volumes. As the PAL box set lacks extras, the episode was not made available on DVD in PAL regions. The episode was released with audio commentary from the creators, which unlike commentary on other episodes in the season is not possible to disable on the DVD set. On June 14, 2010, the unaired pilot was made available with and without commentary for the first time via the iTunes Store.

In 2020, the pilot was shown on Twitch.

Influences

The series is notable for borrowing extensively from East Asian art and mythology for its universe. Its creators employed cultural consultants Edwin Zane and calligrapher Siu-Leung Lee to help determine its art direction and settings. Its character designs are influenced by Chinese art and history, Hinduism, Taoism and Buddhism, and Yoga. Jeremy Zuckerman and Benjamin Wynn created the series' music and sound design together in the early developmental stages and then went on to divide the tasks, Zuckerman taking on the musical responsibility and Wynn the sound design. They experimented with a wide range of instruments, including the guzheng, pipa, and duduk, to match the show's Asia-influenced setting. The art style of the fictitious locations used in the series are based on real locations in Asia. Sites such as the Forbidden City and the Great Wall of China in Beijing were inspirations for the Earth Kingdom city of Ba Sing Se, and Water Tribe locations were based on Inuit and Sireniki cultures. According to writer Aaron Ehasz, early Fire Nation designs were based on Japanese culture. To avoid accidentally making broad statements, they redesigned many settings and peoples to be more "broadly inspired". For the final design, the creators went with a more Chinese style for the Fire Nation's clothing and architecture. For instance, the Fire Temple was based on the Yellow Crane Tower, as its flame-like architectural elements were a perfect motif for the Fire Nation architecture according to the creators.

The gestures used by the "bender" characters are derived from Chinese martial arts, for which the creators employed Sifu Kisu of the Harmonious Fist Chinese Athletic Association as a consultant. Each fighting style is unique to the "benders" who use them or characters who are aligned to a certain element. For example, practitioners of "waterbending" use movements influenced by T'ai chi and focused on alignment, body structure, breath, and visualization. Hung Gar was the inspiration for practitioners of "earthbending", and was chosen for its firmly rooted stances and powerful strikes as a representation of the solidity of earth. Northern Shaolin, which uses strong arm and leg movements, was chosen to represent "firebending". Ba Gua, which uses dynamic circular movements and quick directional changes, was used for "airbending". The Chu Gar Southern Praying Mantis style can be seen practiced by the earthbender Toph, who develops a unique fighting style as a result of her blindness. Asian cinema influenced the presentation of these martial-art bending moves.

Themes
The series addresses many topics rarely touched on in youth entertainment, including issues relating to war, genocide, imperialism, colonialism and totalitarianism, gender discrimination and female empowerment, marginalization and oppression, as well as the philosophical questions surrounding fate, destiny and free will.

The show is set during a period in which the world is engulfed in an imperialistic war initiated by the Fire Nation. While war is a constant backdrop, the show depicts these effects through the eyes of common peoplethe oppressed Earth Kingdom citizens as well as indoctrinated Fire Nation schoolchildrento show how war makes victims of everyone. And while the Fire Nation is presented as the instigator of violence, the show also depicts the systemic inequality experienced by residents in the Earth Kingdom city of Ba Sing Se as well as the nefarious activities of the city's secret police. These situations show the corrupting nature of power and the nuances of good and evil. The show introduces viewers to genocide early on when protagonist Aang visits his former home in the Southern Air Temple. He arrives to discover his people have been massacred and displays a range of emotions, from rage to loss.

The character Zuko and his relationship with his father and Uncle Iroh is the series' main redemption arc, and represents the show's message that destiny and fate are not binding or set by other people, but can be changed. In season two, Zuko struggles to conform to the destiny and path determined by his father, but Iroh prods him, asking, "who are you, what do you want?"

The show also represents a diverse cast of characters in order to tackle the issue of marginalization. For example, in introducing a blind character like Toph and a paraplegic boy like Teo, the show depicted characters with vulnerabilities overcoming their physical and societal limitations. This is also true when it comes to the show's female characters. For example, female protagonist Katara faces systemic sexism when she reaches the Northern Water Tribe to learn waterbending. In another instance, her brother Sokka is initially dismissive of the all-female Kyoshi Warriors, but learns to respect and appreciate their skills. According to Kirk Hamilton of Kotaku, these themes represent the show's message that it is more important to be oneself than hew to societal expectations.

Reception

Ratings
Avatar: The Last Airbender was the highest-rated animated television series in its demographic at its premiere; an average of 1.1 million viewers watched each new episode. It had 5.6 million viewers for its highest-rated episode and was a highly rated part of the Nicktoons lineup beyond its 6-to-11-year-old target demographic. A one-hour special, The Secret of the Fire Nation, consisting of the episodes "The Serpent's Pass" and "The Drill", aired on September 15, 2006, and attracted 4.1 million viewers. According to the Nielsen ratings, the special was the fifth highest-rated cable television program that week. In 2007, Avatar: The Last Airbender was syndicated to more than 105 countries and was one of Nickelodeon's top-rated programs. The series ranked first on Nickelodeon in Germany, Indonesia, Malaysia, the Netherlands, Belgium, and Colombia.

The four-part series finale, "Sozin's Comet", had the series' highest ratings. Its first airing averaged 5.6 million viewers, 95 percent more than Nickelodeon had in mid-July 2007. During the week of July 14, it was the most-viewed program by the under-14 demographic. The finale's popularity was reflected in online media; Rise of the Phoenix King, a Nick.com online game based on "Sozin's Comet", had almost 815,000 game plays in three days.

Critical response
Avatar: The Last Airbender received universal acclaim. , the show has a critics score of 100% on Rotten Tomatoes based on 23 reviews. Max Nicholson of IGN called it a "must-watch" and described it as "one of the greatest animated series of all time". Nick Hartel of DVD Talk called the series a remarkable, "child friendly show" whose legacy "should endure for years to come". Erik Amaya of Bleeding Cool described the series as "impressive in its sophistication" and "fantastic". Henry Glasheen of SLUG Magazine called the series "adventurous and exciting", a "classic" and occasionally moving. According to Brittany Lovely of Hypable, it tells "complex and beautiful" stories. Joe Corey of Inside Pulse described the series as an anime-action hybrid. Chris Mitchell of Popzara called it one of best shows to air on Nickelodeon, praising the series' background music and voice acting. D. F. Smith of IGN recommended it to viewers who enjoy action-adventure cartoons.

Rob Keyes of Screen Rant called the series "one of the greatest cartoons ever made". Mike Noyes of Inside Pulse recommended it to viewers who enjoy "great" adventure. Gord Lacey of TVShowsOnDVD.com called the series "one of the finest animated shows ever". According to Todd Douglass, Jr. of DVD Talk, adults will enjoy the series as much as children do. Joshua Miller of CHUD.com called it "phenomenal" and "one of the most well animated programs (children's or adult) American TV has ever had"; according to Miller, the series is heavily influenced by anime. Tim Janson of Cinefantastique described it as "one of the most engaging animated shows produced". Dennis Amith of J!ENT called the series "one of the best animated TV series shown in the US by American creators". Amith praised its sophisticated storylines, edginess, humor, and action. Franco "Cricket" Te of Nerd Society described Avatar: The Last Airbender as "one of the best cartoon[s]" he had ever seen, recommending the series for its characters and plot. Scott Thill of Wired called the series engaging and its setting, influenced by the Eastern world, "fantastic".
Kirk Hamilton of Kotaku said the series should be part of the Golden Age of Television, and recommended "the sophisticated kids show" to others.

The show's writing and themes have been widely lauded by critics. Michael S. Mammano of Den of Geek called the plot "smartly-written" and praised the animation. Nicole Clark, writing for Vice News, stated that the show's narrative depth was "its greatest asset", and praised the story's "emotional authenticity" and how it "expose[d] very young viewers to darker subject matter, like genocide and authoritarianism, while giving them a framework for understanding these issues." Jenifer Rosenberg of ComicMix liked the program's emphasis on family, friends, community, and education. According to Nick Hartel, the series touches on themes of "genocide and self-doubt" without frightening younger children; rogue characters are redeemable, sending an important message that people can change and are not bonded to "destiny". Chris Mitchell called the plot "fantastic". D. F. Smith compared the series' plot to Japanese action cartoons, calling its tone and dialogue "very American" and praising the humor leavening an epic, dramatic theme suitable for all ages. Rob Keyes also praised the series' humor and affecting plot: "[It] will capture your hearts".

According to Mike Noyes, the series amalgamates elements of "classic fantasy epics". Todd Douglass, Jr. called the plot engaging, well-thought-out, and meaningful. The series' concept is "well-realized", with a consistent story. Douglass wrote that the characters "[have] a real sense of progression", and praised the writers for their humor, drama, and emotion. Joshua Miller called the series surprisingly dark despite its "silly" theme; the plot is livelier than that of Lost and, similar to the latter show, emphasizes character development. According to Miller, its writing was "true adult levels of storytelling". Tim Janson described the series as more than fantasy- and superhero-themed, seeing the characters as central and relatable. "Cricket" Te praised the series' use of Buddhist philosophies and the diverse presentation of its themes of courage and life. Kirk Hamiltion praises the series for expressing towards its audience to be themselves and for its quiet progressivism.

Critics also praised Avatar: The Last Airbenders character development, art, animation, and choreography; Eric Amaya enjoyed the expressive animation that complements the writing. According to Amaya, the elements were influenced by Hayao Miyazaki. Todd Douglass, Jr. called the character development interesting, while Nicole Clark wrote that the show "managed to do what so few shows even today have: assemble a cast of characters that depicts the world as it is, with a range of identities and experiences." Jenifer Rosenburg praised the series' portrayal of females as "strong, responsible, [and] intelligent". According to Joshua Miller, the bender characters' use of bending for everyday activities brings "depth and believability" to the Avatar world. Miller called the series' designs "rich and immersive", with each nation having its own, detailed look. He praised the action scenes as "well rendered", comparing the development of the Avatar world to that of The Lord of the Rings, and the fight choreography as "wonderful in its most minor details". D. F. Smith enjoyed the series' painstaking backgrounds. "Cricket" Te praised each episode's color palette and the choreography's combination of martial arts and magic. Nick Hartel criticized the animation, although he found it an improvement over previous Nickelodeon shows. Chris Mitchell called the animation fluid. "Cricket" Te agreed, noting its manga influence. According to Brittany Lovely, non-bender characters in battle are "overshadowed" by their bender counterparts. Joe Corey called the animation's action and environments a "great achievement", and Rob Keyes praised the series' fight choreography. According to Kirk Hamilton, the action sequences in the series are amazing while being child-appropriate and exciting.

Legacy
Avatar: The Last Airbender has become a cult classic and had a large impact in the 2010s on how networks viewed animated programs; subsequent children's shows would often blur the lines between youth and adult programming, featuring more adult themes.

Multiple media publications have hailed Avatar as one of the best (animated) television series of all time. In 2013, TV Guide included Avatar among the 60 greatest cartoon of all-time list. In 2018, Vanity Fair ranked the series as the 11th-best animated TV show. IndieWire ranked Avatar at number 36 on its 2018 list of the "50 Best Animated Series Of All Time".

The series experienced a resurgence in popularity following its addition to Netflix on May 15, 2020; it reached the number-one position on the platform's top series in the U.S. four days after release, and was the most-popular film or show for the week of May 14–21. The series maintained a spot within Netflix's top ten series for a record-setting 60 days, the most of any show since the company debuted its list of top series in February 2020. The series would become the most-streamed children's series on the platform for the year. Both fans and co-creators Michael Dante DiMartino and Bryan Konietzko attributed Avatars renewed popularity to its relevance to contemporary events, including the COVID-19 pandemic and racial unrest in the U.S., with DiMartino remarking: "The major issues in the storiesgenocide, totalitarianism, systemic injustice, abusesadly, these have been pervasive issues throughout history and continue to be. The show is a reflection of our world. But now, we happen to be living through a time in which all these problems have been exacerbated."

Awards and nominations

Other media

Books
Several books based on the show have been published. Dark Horse Comics published an art book titled Avatar: The Last Airbender – The Art of the Animated Series on June 2, 2010, with 184 pages of original art from the series.

Comics

Several comic-book short stories were published in Nickelodeon Magazine, and Dark Horse published Avatar: The Last Airbender – The Lost Adventures—a collection of these and new comics—on June 15, 2011.

Dark Horse published a graphic-novel series by Gene Yang that continues Aang's story after the Hundred Years' War. Avatar: The Last Airbender – The Promise, published in three volumes in 2012, explores the fate of the Fire Nation colonies that become The Legend of Korras United Republic. This series was translated into Hebrew in 2016–2017. A second set of three comic books, Avatar: The Last Airbender – The Search, focuses on Zuko and Azula, and the fate of their mother Ursa. The second set was translated into Hebrew in 2018–2019. The third set, Avatar: The Last Airbender – The Rift, shifts the focus to Aang, the creation of Republic City, and Toph's relationship with her family. The Rift was followed by Avatar: The Last Airbender – Smoke and Shadow about a resistance force in the Fire Nation against Firelord Zuko, who at the end of the original series assumed the throne. The fifth graphic novel was Avatar: The Last Airbender – North and South, which follows the events of Smoke and Shadow and is about Katara and Sokka returning to the Water Tribe to see various changes to their homeland. The next graphic novel is titled Imbalance and was released in October 2018. The series explores the emerging conflict between the benders and non-benders that becomes the center for the conflict in the first season of the sequel, The Legend of Korra. Unlike the previous five books it was written by Faith Erin Hicks.

Prequel novel series
A two-part young adult novel series focusing on Avatar Kyoshi written by F. C. Yee was published in July 2019 by Abrams Children's Books. The first book of the Kyoshi Novels is Avatar: The Last Airbender – The Rise of Kyoshi. The second part in the series, titled The Shadow of Kyoshi, was released on July 21, 2020.

Video games
A video-game trilogy based on the series has been released. The Avatar: The Last Airbender video game was released on October 10, 2006, and Avatar: The Last Airbender – The Burning Earth was released on October 16, 2007. Avatar: The Last Airbender – Into the Inferno was released on October 13, 2008. Avatar: Legends of the Arena, a massively multiplayer online role-playing game (MMORPG) for Microsoft Windows, was released on September 15, 2008, by Nickelodeon. Players can create their own character and interact with other players around the world. Avatar: The Last Airbender was THQ's bestselling Nickelodeon game in 2006 and was one of Sony CEA's Greatest Hits. Aang and Zuko appear as skins for Merlin and Susano, respectively, in Smite. Avatar: The Last Airbender characters and locations are featured in Nickelodeon Kart Racers 2: Grand Prix. A turn-based role-playing game by Navigation Games, titled Avatar Generations, is scheduled for an early 2023 release for iOS and Android.

Film adaptation

The series' first season was the basis of the 2010 live-action film The Last Airbender, which was written and directed by M. Night Shyamalan. It was intended as the first of a trilogy of films, each of which would be based upon one of the three television seasons. The film was universally panned for its writing, acting, whitewashed cast, and Shyamalan's direction; it earned a 5% approval rating on Rotten Tomatoes as well as five Razzies at the 31st Golden Raspberry Awards, including Worst Picture, and some critics described it as one of the worst films ever made. Although the film originally shared the title of the television series, the title The Last Airbender was used because producers feared it would be confused with James Cameron's film Avatar. The Last Airbender stars Noah Ringer as Aang, Nicola Peltz as Katara, Jackson Rathbone as Sokka, Dev Patel as Zuko, and Shaun Toub as Iroh.

Sequel series

The Legend of Korra, a sequel series to Avatar: The Last Airbender, premiered on Nickelodeon on April 14, 2012. It was written and produced by Michael Dante DiMartino and Bryan Konietzko, the creators and producers of the original series. The show was initially titled Avatar: Legend of Korra, then The Last Airbender: Legend of Korra; its events occur seventy years after the end of Avatar: The Last Airbender. The series' protagonist is Korra, a 17-year-old girl from the Southern Water Tribe who is the incarnation of the Avatar after Aang's death.

Live-action series remake

Netflix announced in September 2018 that a "reimagined" live-action remake of Avatar was to start production in 2019. The series' original creators, DiMartino and Konietzko, were to be the executive producers and showrunners. The two said that they intended to adapt the series "with a culturally appropriate, non-whitewashed cast". It was announced that Jeremy Zuckerman, who composed music for the original show, would also be returning to do the music for the remake. On August 12, 2020, Michael Dante DiMartino and Bryan Konietzko both revealed on their social media that they had departed the show due to creative differences.

In February 2021, Albert Kim was reported to have been brought on as the showrunner. In August later that year, it was reported that Gordon Cormier, Kiawentiio Tarbell, Ian Ousley and Dallas Liu were cast in the roles of Aang, Katara, Sokka and Zuko, respectively. On November 3, Daniel Dae Kim, who voiced General Fong in the original series, was reported to have been cast as Fire Lord Ozai, followed two weeks later by Paul Sun-Hyung Lee, Lim Kay Siu and Ken Leung in their respective roles as Iroh, Gyatso and Zhao, along with news that production had begun in Vancouver. More casting news followed in December, with Elizabeth Yu, Maria Zhang, Yvonne Chapman, Casey Camp-Horinek and Tamlyn Tomita respectively cast as Azula, Suki, Kyoshi, Kanna and Yukari, the latter an original character.

Avatar Studios
On February 24, 2021, ViacomCBS announced Avatar Studios, a new division of Nickelodeon centered on developing animated series and films set in the Avatar universe, to be distributed via Nickelodeon's linear and digital services, Paramount+, theatres, and other third-party platforms. The division is helmed by original series creators DiMartino and Konietzko, who are its co-chief creative officers and report to Nickelodeon Animation Studio president Ramsey Ann Naito. In addition to this announcement, the company also stated the studio would begin production of an animated film sometime in 2021. Konietzko and DiMartino remarked that "with this new Avatar Studios venture we have an unparalleled opportunity to develop our franchise and its storytelling on a vast scale, in myriad exciting ways and mediums", while ViacomCBS Kids & Family president Brian Robbins declared "Avatar: The Last Airbender and Korra have grown at least ten-fold in popularity since their original hit runs on Nickelodeon, and Ramsey Naito and I are incredibly excited to have Mike and Bryan's genius talent on board to helm a studio devoted to expanding their characters and world into new content and formats for fans everywhere".

Animated films
On June 15, 2022, Paramount announced that three animated Avatar: The Last Airbender films are in production.

Tabletop roleplaying game

On July 12, 2021, Magpie Games announced that on August 3 of the same year they'd be launching a Kickstarter campaign for Avatar Legends: The Roleplaying Game, an officially licensed tabletop roleplaying game set in the universe of Avatar: The Last Airbender and The Legend of Korra. The campaign raised USD $ 9.53M, becoming the most successful campaign for a tabletop game in Kickstarter's history. Pre-orders for much of the game's content opened on October 12, 2022.

Explanatory notes

References

External links

 
 

 
2000s American animated television series
2000s Nickelodeon original programming
2005 American television series debuts
2008 American television series endings
Anime-influenced animation
Anime-influenced Western animation
Anime-influenced Western animated television series
Annie Award winners
Fiction about deicide
Emmy Award-winning programs
English-language television shows
Peabody Award-winning television programs
Television shows about reincarnation
Television shows adapted into comics
Television shows adapted into video games